Patrick Vermeulen (born 11 September 1958) is a Belgian racing cyclist. He rode in the 1983 Tour de France.

References

1958 births
Living people
Belgian male cyclists
Place of birth missing (living people)